Château de Mareuil may refer to:

Château de Mareuil (Dordogne)
Château de Mareuil (Marne)